Suffolk University Law School (also known as Suffolk Law School) is the private, non-sectarian law school of Suffolk University located in downtown Boston, Massachusetts, across the street from the Boston Common and the Freedom Trail, two blocks from the State House, and a short walk to the financial district. Suffolk Law was founded in 1906 by Gleason Archer Sr. to provide a legal education for those who traditionally lacked the opportunity to study law because of socio-economic or racial discrimination.

Suffolk Law school has full-time, part-time evening, hybrid online, accelerated and dual-degree JD programs. It has been accredited by the American Bar Association since 1953 and the Association of American Law Schools since 1977.

The school's legal skills programs (clinics, legal writing, trial advocacy, and dispute resolution) are ranked among the top 25 in the country by U.S. News & World Report (2023 guide). The legal writing program is ranked No. 4 in the nation by US News. In 2021, the school was ranked the nation's #1 "Technology Leader" by PreLaw magazine, which noted students' access-to-justice innovations during the pandemic.

The institution publishes five student-run law reviews, to which students, faculty, and other scholars contribute.

According to Suffolk's Office of Professional and Career Development 2021 ABA-required disclosures, 82.8% of the Class of 2021 obtained full-time, long-term, bar admission required or JD advantage employment nine months after graduation.

History

One of New England's oldest law schools, Suffolk was founded in 1906 by lawyer Gleason Leonard Archer as the "Suffolk School of Law." The school was named after its location in Suffolk County, Massachusetts. Archer's goal was to provide immigrants and the working class with the opportunity to study law. In 1907, Archer moved the school from Roxbury, Massachusetts to downtown Boston. Suffolk Law School's first student passed the bar in 1908.  By 1930, Archer developed Suffolk into one of the largest law schools in the country, and the law school received full accreditation from the American Bar Association (ABA). Originally an all-male school, with the New England School of Law serving as a sister school, Suffolk became co-educational in 1937. In 1999, Suffolk Law School opened its new building at 120 Tremont Street, near the Boston Common.

Curriculum and programs

Suffolk Law has full-time, part-time evening, hybrid online, accelerated and dual-degree JD programs.  Academic concentrations are available in intellectual property, international law, business law & financial services, health & biomedical law, legal innovation & technology, and trial & appellate advocacy. Dual degree options include: JD/MBA; Accelerated JD/MBA (three years for both degrees); JD/Master of Public Administration; JD/Master of Science in finance; JD/Master of Science in crime & justice studies; JD/Master of Sciences in law: life sciences; and the Accelerated JD/LL.M. in Taxation (three years for both degrees). The school also offers the  Doctor of Juridical Science (SJD).

Accelerated JD students begin first year (1L) classes in May and attend classes year-round so they can earn their degrees one year faster than traditional JD students (two years full time; three years part-time). Accelerated students have the same required coursework, take the same number of credits, and pay the same per-semester cost as traditional JD students— but graduate one year earlier.

Part-time evening JD students take a reduced schedule with all classes offered after 6 p.m. Evening students can choose the traditional or accelerated track, to graduate in as few as 2.5 years (including two summers) or up to four years (classes in the fall and spring semesters only).

Hybrid Online JD students earn a JD with a mix of in-person and online classes. They take their first 30 credit hours in-person at Suffolk Law in Boston then enroll in the remaining JD coursework (54 credits) online or a mix of in-person and online. The Hybrid Online JD is available for full- or part-time evening students who achieve a 3.0 during their first year of law school.

Students at ABA-accredited law schools can enroll in summer courses at Suffolk Law. All summer classes are offered after 6 p.m.

Foreign-educated attorneys may enroll in up to 15 non-degree credits at Suffolk Law to satisfy the requirements of Massachusetts Rule 6 and sit for the Massachusetts Bar Exam.

Admissions

In 2022, Suffolk received 2,835 applications for its entering class of 446 students, which included 351 full-time students and 95 part-time evening students. The median GPA for incoming 2022 Suffolk Law students was 3.5, and the median LSAT score was 154. The 25th-75th percentile GPA was 3.2-3.7 and the 25th-75th percentile LSAT was 150–158. Incoming Suffolk Law School students in 2022 came from 37 states, 7 countries and 211 colleges and universities. The incoming class of 2022 remained among the most diverse since 2014, with 23% of incoming students identifying as ethnically diverse. In addition, 25% of incoming students identified as being first-generation college students.

Academic rankings and honors

In its 2023 guide, U.S. News & World Report ranked Suffolk as the 122nd Best Law School. In the US News Best Law Schools guides from 2017 to 2023, Suffolk's clinics, legal writing, trial advocacy, and dispute resolution programs have all ranked in the top 35 (top 20 percent)--the only law school with this distinction.

Suffolk's legal writing program (No. 4 in 2023 Guide) has ranked in the U.S. News top 10 for eleven consecutive years. The clinical program (No. 15) has placed in the top 20 for seven consecutive years. Trial advocacy (No. 21) has been ranked in the top 25 for seven years in a row. Dispute Resolution is ranked No. 22 and was in the top 25 from 2013 to 2021. Intellectual Property is ranked No. 28. In 2021 (the most current ranking), Suffolk Law's legal technology program was named No. 1 in the nation by PreLaw magazine.

Suffolk's National Trial Team has won the New England regional championships in the American Association of Justice Student Advocacy Competition or the National Trial Competition 29 times in the last 37 years (as of 2022).

Libraries and archives

In 1999, after construction of the new law school building was completed, the John Joseph Moakley Library moved to its new home, on the fifth through seventh floors, in Sargent Hall.  The library contains over 450,000 volumes, and budget of new acquisitions reaching approximately $2 million, covering common law and statutes from all major areas of American law in each of the 50 states, the District of Columbia, and with primary legal materials from the U.S. federal government, Canada, the United Kingdom, the United Nations, and the European Union.

The library also features a substantial treatise and periodical collection and houses the John Joseph Moakley Archive and Institute. Some of the collections in the Archive include the Congressman John Joseph Moakley Papers, a collection of the late U.S. Representative's papers which he gave to the school in 2001; the Gleason L. Archer Personal Papers, founder of the Law School and University; the Harry Hom Dow Papers a 1929 Law School graduate; the Jamaica Plain Committee on Central America Collection; and the Records of Suffolk University. The Library also houses law review journals from all ABA accredited law schools in the United States as well as numerous journals from European and Canadian law schools. Suffolk also records and broadcasts oral arguments for the Massachusetts Supreme Judicial Court and has archives of those proceedings available in the library and online.

Law review and journal publications

Suffolk University Law School maintains five student-run publications.

Employment 
According to Suffolk Law's office of Professional and Career Development 2021 ABA-required disclosures, 82.8% of the Class of 2021 obtained full-time, long-term, bar admission required or JD advantage employment ten months after graduation.

Costs
The tuition at Suffolk Law for the 2022–2023 academic year is $53,920 for the day division and $40,440 for the night division.

Notable people

Throughout Suffolk's history, faculty and alumni have played prominent roles in many different fields. Its 24,000 alumni are found in high-level judicial, political, and private positions throughout the United States.

Judiciary 
Several State Supreme Court judges, including associate justices of the Massachusetts Supreme Judicial Court Elspeth B. Cypher, Frank Gaziano, and Serge Georges Jr., graduated from Suffolk Law. Other alumni include Chief Justice Paul Suttell and senior justice Maureen McKenna Goldberg of the Rhode Island Supreme Court, and Chief Justice Paul Reiber of the Vermont Supreme Court.

As of March 2021, 27% of active judges in Massachusetts had graduated from Suffolk Law School, more than any other law school. Out of a total of 440 judges at that time, including 41 federal and 399 state, 118 or more than one out of four sitting judges, were Suffolk Law alumni. As of 2021, more than 40% of all judges in Rhode Island were Suffolk Law graduates.Several federal judges graduated from Suffolk Law, including:
 Frank Bailey, Chief Judge of the U.S. Bankruptcy Court for the District of Massachusetts.
 Marianne Bowler, Magistrate Judge of the District Court for the District of Massachusetts 
 Gustavo Gelpí, circuit judge of the Court of Appeals for the First Circuit.
 Timothy S. Hillman, Senior United States district judge of the District Court for the District of Massachusetts.
 Richard J. Leon, Senior United States district judge of the District Court for the District of Columbia. 
 Mary S. McElroy, United States district judge of the District Court for the District of Rhode Island.

Government 

Graduates of the school include the U.S. Ambassador to Ireland Claire D. Cronin, Massachusetts Secretary of State William F. Galvin, General Counsel for the United States Senate Select Committee on Intelligence Brett Freedman, as well as U.S. Representatives Bill Keating and Martin "Marty" Meehan (Meehan served in the House from 1993 to 2007, and is currently president of University of Massachusetts), and the late Congressman Joe Moakley (1973-2001). Several members of the Rhode Island House of Representatives are Suffolk Law alumni, including current Speaker of the House Joe Shekarchi and Senate Majority Leader Michael McCaffrey.

Alumni of the school also serve as district attorneys, including Jonathan Blodgett of Essex County, Massachusetts, Timothy Cruz of Plymouth County, Massachusetts, Michael Morrissey of Norfolk County, Massachusetts, and Thomas Quinn of Bristol County, Massachusetts.

Anthony J. Benedetti, Chief Counsel of the Committee for Public Counsel Services, and former Massachusetts Secretary of Public Safety and Security Andrea Cabral are also alumni.

Military 
Suffolk alumni have served in a variety of roles in the military. Notable examples include:
 Mike Dumont (Ret.) Vice Admiral of the U.S. Navy, Deputy Commander of the U.S. Northern Command, and Vice Commander of the U.S. Element of the NORAD.
 Carol M. Lynch (Ret.) Rear Admiral, Deputy Judge Advocate General of the Navy for Reserve Affairs and Operations, and Deputy Commander of the Naval Legal Service Command
 Philip McGovern, Lieutenant Colonel and Strategic Plans & Policy Officer of the Massachusetts National Guard and the Joint Staff, Strategy, Policy & Plans for Pol-Mil Affairs: Europe, NATO and Russia, Department of Defense
 Robert E. Reed (Ret.) Chief of the United States Military Justice Division, United States Air Force.

Corporate and nonprofit 
Many alumni are in-house counsel at notable companies and organizations. These include Scott Gerwin, senior counsel for Google, Inc; C.M. Tokë Vandervoort, chief legal officer of the Environmental Defense Fund; Debra Milasincic, senior vice president of Intellectual Property for Moderna; Deborah Marson, executive vice president, general counsel and secretary of Iron Mountain; Matt Penarczyk, head of legal (Americas) for social media platform TikTok; John "Jay" Tangney, executive vice president and general counsel, Suffolk Construction Company; and Michelle M. Garvin, executive vice president and system general counsel and chief of staff at Boston Children's Hospital.

Health Law Advocates' executive director Matt Selig, and Setti Warren, executive director of the Harvard Kennedy School Institute of Politics and former mayor of Newton, Massachusetts, are also graduates of Suffolk Law. Warren was the first African-American to be elected mayor in Massachusetts through the popular vote.

Sports industry lawyers 
Suffolk Law graduates working in the sports industry include Larry Ferazani, General Counsel for the National Football League; R. Stanton Dodge, Chief Legal Officer of DraftKings; David Duquette, Director of Basketball Strategy and Team Counsel for the Charlotte Hornets; Jill Kelley, Vice President of Legal Affairs for the New York Jets; Mandy Petrillo, Senior Club Counsel for the Boston Red Sox; Kim Miale, Roc Nation Sports NFL agent and general counsel; Kristen Kuliga, Principal and Founder of K Sports & Entertainment LLC.

Academia 
Many alumni of Suffolk Law have become heads of universities, such as Marty Meehan, president of University of Massachusetts, John D. Keenan, president of Salem State University, and Jo Ann Rooney, president of Loyola University Chicago. David Sargent served as president of Suffolk University.

Suffolk Law professor and legal scholar Joseph Glannon authored the nationally famous Glannon Guide to Civil Procedure.

Historical alumni 
Many alumni were historically notable for breaking boundaries in the legal field. Suffolk University founder Archer Gleason wanted to "open the doors to higher education to all capable students," and as a result the school was more inclusive of students from marginalized backgrounds.

Thaddeus Alexander Kitchener, a Jamaican immigrant, was the first person of color to graduate from Suffolk Law, earning his degree in 1913. Louis Eugene Pasco, who earned his degree in 1914, was the first Latino to graduate from the school. In 1922, Shichiro Hayashi became the first Asian alumnus of Suffolk Law. In 1925, Nelson D. Simons, future chief of the Mashpee Wampanoag Tribe, was the first Native American to graduate from the school. After graduating from Suffolk Law in 1929, Harry Hom Dow went on to become the first Chinese-American to pass the Massachusetts Bar Exam. The first woman to graduate from Suffolk Law was Marian Archer MacDonald in 1937. Charlotte Anne Perretta, the first woman to sit on the Massachusetts Appeals Court as an associate justice, graduated from Suffolk Law in 1967. Linda Dalianis became the first female appointee to the New Hampshire Superior Court (1980) and the New Hampshire Supreme Court (2000), and chief justice of the New Hampshire Supreme Court in 2010.

Notable faculty and trustees
Karen Blum, professor of law, co-author of Police Misconduct: Law and Litigation
Steven Ferrey, professor of law, author of The Law of Independent Power
Joseph Glannon, professor of law, author of Examples & Explanations: Civil Procedure
John Infranca, professor of law, co-editor of the Cambridge Handbook on the Law of the Sharing Economy
Robert C. Lamb, Jr., chair of trustees, former chairman and CEO of Allied International Holdings, Inc
Renée Landers, professor of law, former Deputy General Counsel for the U.S. Department of Health and Human Services
Sharmila Murthy, professor of law, senior counsel, White House Council on Environmental Quality
Amy L. Nechtem, trustee, chief justice of the Massachusetts Juvenile Court Department
Michael Rustad, professor of law, co-author of  Global Information Technologies: Ethics and the Law 
Mark Sullivan, trustee, former general counsel of Bose Corp.
David Yamada, professor of law, co-editor of Workplace Bullying and Mobbing in the United States

Honorary degree recipients and speakers
John F. Kennedy, 35th President of the United States
Calvin Coolidge, 30th President of the United States
William Rehnquist, Chief Justice of the U.S. Supreme Court
Stephen Breyer, Justice U.S. Supreme Court
Antonin Scalia, Justice U.S. Supreme Court
Ruth Bader Ginsburg,  Justice U.S. Supreme Court
Andrew Card, Chief of Staff to George W. Bush
Ralph Nader, consumer advocate, Green Party Presidential nominee
Edward Kennedy, U.S. Senator from Massachusetts
Coretta Scott King, civil rights activist
Edwin Meese III, U.S. Attorney General
Richard Posner, Judge, U.S. Court of Appeals
Rudy Giuliani, Mayor of New York City
Robert S. Mueller III, director of the Federal Bureau of Investigation, Special prosecutor for the United States Department of Justice
Cory Booker, Senator New Jersey
Mitt Romney, 2012 Republican Candidate for President and former Governor of Massachusetts
Chris Matthews, host of MSNBC's Hardball with Chris Matthews

Suffolk Law School in television, film and literature
The Practice, ABC (1997–2004)—Bobby Donnell is a Suffolk Law alumnus played by Dylan McDermott.
The Departed (2006)—In the film, Matt Damon plays a Suffolk Law School night student, Colin Sullivan. Parts of the movie were filmed at Suffolk.
Boston Legal, ABC (2005–2006)—Justin Mentell plays Garrett Wells, a hot-shot attorney who graduated at the top of his class from Suffolk Law.
The Late George Apley—In this 1937 Pulitzer Prize-winning novel, the gardener's grandson, pensioner of a wealthy family, attends Suffolk Law.

See also
Suffolk University
North American Consortium on Legal Education

References

External links
Official website

 
Universities and colleges in Boston
Law schools in Massachusetts
Educational institutions established in 1906
Financial District, Boston
1906 establishments in Massachusetts